Click-through rate (CTR) is the ratio of clicks on a specific link to the number of total users who view a page, email, or advertisement. It is commonly used to measure the success of an online advertising campaign for a particular website, as well as the effectiveness of email campaigns.

Click-through rates for ad campaigns vary tremendously. The first online display ad, shown for AT&T on the website HotWired in 1994, had a 44% click-through rate.  With time, the overall rate of user's clicks on webpage banner ads has decreased.

Purpose 

The purpose of click-through rates is to measure the ratio of clicks to impressions of an online ad or email marketing campaign. Generally, the higher the CTR, the more effective the marketing campaign has been at bringing people to a website. Most commercial websites are designed to elicit some sort of action, whether it be to buy a book, read a news article, watch a music video, or search for a flight. People rarely visit websites with the intention of viewing advertisements, in the same way that few people watch television to view the commercials.

While marketers want to know the reaction of the web visitor, with current technology it is nearly impossible to quantify the emotional reaction to the site and the effect of that site on the firm's brand. In contrast, it is easy to determine the click-through rate, which measures the proportion of visitors who clicked on an advertisement that redirected them to another page. Forms of interaction with advertisements other than clicking are possible but rare; "click-through rate" is the most commonly used term to describe the efficacy of an advert.

Construction 

The click-through rate of an advertisement is the number of times a click is made on the ad, divided by the number of times the ad is "served", that is, shown (also called impressions), expressed as a percentage:

Online advertising

Click-through rates for banner ads have decreased over time. When banner ads first started to appear, it was not uncommon to have rates above five percent. They have fallen since then, currently averaging closer to 0.2 or 0.3 percent. In most cases, a 2% click-through rate would be considered very successful, though the exact number is hotly debated and would vary depending on the situation. The average click-through rate of 3% in the 1990s declined to 2.4%–0.4% by 2002.  Since advertisers typically pay more for a high click-through rate, getting many click-throughs with few purchases is undesirable to advertisers. Similarly, by selecting an appropriate advertising site with high affinity (e.g., a movie magazine for a movie advertisement), the same banner can achieve a substantially higher CTR. Though personalized ads, unusual formats, and more obtrusive ads typically result in higher click-through rates than standard banner ads, overly intrusive ads are often avoided by viewers.

Modern online advertising has moved beyond just using banner ads. Popular search engines allow advertisers to display ads in with the search results triggered by a search user. These ads are usually in text format and may include additional links and information like phone numbers, addresses, and specific product pages. This additional information moves away from the poor user experience that can be created from intrusive banner ads and provides useful information to the search user, resulting in higher click-through rates for this format of pay-per-click Advertising. Since CTR is an expression of relevancy of the ads to the user search, higher click-through rates are generally rewarded with a better quality score attributed to the ads, which in turns might lead to lower CPC, therefore incentivising advertisers to continually improve the relevancy of their ads. However, having a high click-through rate isn't the only goal for an online advertiser, who may develop campaigns to raise awareness for the overall gain of valuable traffic, sacrificing some click-through rate for that purpose.

Estimating the Click-Through Rate for Ads

Search engine advertising has become a significant element of the Web browsing experience. Choosing the right ads for the query and the order in which they are displayed greatly affects the probability that a user will see and click on each ad. This ranking has a strong impact on the revenue the search engine receives from the ads. Further, showing the user an ad that they prefer to click on improves user satisfaction. For these reasons, there is an increasing interest in accurately estimating the click-through rate of ads in a recommender system.

Email

An email click-through rate is defined as the number of recipients who click one or more links in an email and landed on the sender's website, blog, or other desired destination. More simply, email click-through rates represent the number of clicks that your email generated.

Email click-through rate is expressed as a percentage, and calculated by dividing the number of click-throughs by the number of tracked message deliveries.

Most email marketers use this metrics, along with open rate, bounce rate and other metrics, to understand the effectiveness and success of their email campaign. In general there is no ideal click-through rate. This metric can vary based on the type of email sent, how frequently emails are sent, how the list of recipients is segmented, how relevant the content of the email is to the audience, and many other factors. Even time of day can affect click-through rate. Sunday appears to generate considerably higher click-through rates on average when compared to the rest of the week.

Every year, various types of research studies are conducted to track the overall effectiveness of click-through rates in email marketing.

Click-Through Rate and Search Engine Optimization

Some experts on search engine optimization (SEO) have claimed since the mid-2010s that click-through rate has an impact on organic rankings. Numerous case studies have been published to support this theory. Proponents supporting this theory often claim that click-through rate is a ranking signal for Google's RankBrain algorithm. 

Opponents of this theory claim that the click-through rate has little or no impact on organic rankings. Bartosz Góralewicz published the results of an experiment on Search Engine Land where he claims, "Despite popular belief, click-through rate is not a ranking factor. Even massive organic traffic won’t affect your website’s organic positions." More recently, Barry Schwartz wrote on Search Engine Land, "...Google has said countless times, in writing, at conferences, that CTR is not used in their ranking algorithm."

See also 

 Abandonment rate
 Banner blindness
 Clickbait
 Click fraud
 CTR – Click-through rate
 Clicktag
 CPA – Cost per acquisition 
 Cost per action
 Cost per click
 Cost per lead
 Cost per thousand
 CPI
 eCPA – effective cost per acquisition/action
 Internet marketing
 PPC – Pay per click
 View-through rate

References

Further reading
Sherman, Lee and John Deighton, (2001), "Banner advertising: Measuring effectiveness and optimizing placement," Journal of Interactive Marketing, Spring, Vol. 15, Iss. 2.
Ward A. Hanson and Kirthi Kalyanam, (2007), Internet Marketing and eCommerce, Chapter8, Traffic Building, Thomson College Pub, Mason, Ohio.

External links 
 MASB Official Website

Advertising indicators
Audience measurement
Online advertising
Email
Consumer behaviour
Rates